Sisyphus indicus, is a species of dung beetle found in India, Nepal and Sri Lanka.

References 

Scarabaeinae
Insects of Sri Lanka
Insects of India
Insects described in 1831